Benton is a town in Grafton County, New Hampshire, United States. The population was 374 at the 2020 census. Located in the White Mountains, Benton is largely surrounded by the White Mountain National Forest. The town is crossed by the Appalachian Trail.

History
The town was granted by Governor Benning Wentworth on January 31, 1764, to Theophilus Fitch and others. It was named "Coventry" after Coventry, Connecticut, hometown to many of the settlers, who arrived shortly after the beginning of the Revolution. At the suggestion of Governor Isaac Hill, the name was changed on December 4, 1840, to Benton, in honor of Thomas Hart Benton, the Missouri senator who championed American westward expansion.

With a rough and mountainous terrain, the town was not suited for agriculture. But Benton had water power sites and abundant forests. By 1859, when the population was 478, there were five sawmills producing a large quantity of lumber. The Boston, Concord & Montreal Railroad ran through the town, which once included the village of Glencliff.

Atop Mount Moosilauke in 1860 was built the Prospect House, later renamed the Tip Top House, a stone hotel with accommodations for 35 hikers. A carriage road was built to the summit in 1870, so the hotel was enlarged in 1872 to accommodate 50 guests. In 1920, the hotel and land were given to Dartmouth College, but in 1942, the Tip Top House burned.

Geography
It is drained primarily by Oliverian Brook and the Wild Ammonoosuc River, and the Baker River drains the southeast corner. The Oliverian Brook and Wild Ammonoosuc portion of the town is within the Connecticut River watershed, while the small part in the southeast corner is in the Merrimack River watershed.

The northern corner of Benton is crossed by New Hampshire Route 116.

Climate

According to the Köppen Climate Classification system, Benton has a warm-summer humid continental climate, abbreviated "Dfb" on climate maps.

Demographics

As of the census of 2000, there were 314 people, 91 households, and 59 families residing in the town.  The population density was 6.5 people per square mile (2.5/km2).  There were 155 housing units at an average density of 3.2 per square mile (1.2/km2).  The racial makeup of the town was 97.45% White, 0.32% Asian, and 2.23% from two or more races.

There were 91 households, out of which 30.8% had children under the age of 18 living with them, 56.0% were married couples living together, 6.6% had a female householder with no husband present, and 34.1% were non-families. 28.6% of all households were made up of individuals, and 11.0% had someone living alone who was 65 years of age or older.  The average household size was 2.43 and the average family size was 2.95.

In the town, the population was spread out, with 18.8% under the age of 18, 4.5% from 18 to 24, 22.3% from 25 to 44, 22.0% from 45 to 64, and 32.5% who were 65 years of age or older.  The median age was 48 years. For every 100 females, there were 78.4 males.  For every 100 females age 18 and over, there were 75.9 males.

The median income for a household in the town was $34,167, and the median income for a family was $40,417. Males had a median income of $28,125 versus $22,188 for females. The per capita income for the town was $13,220.  About 3.8% of families and 8.8% of the population were below the poverty line, including none of those under age 18 and 13.0% of those age 65 or over.

See also

 White Mountain art

References

External links

 
 New Hampshire Economic and Labor Market Information Bureau Profile
 Benton (N.H.) Records, 1804–1857 at Dartmouth College Library

Towns in Grafton County, New Hampshire
Towns in New Hampshire